Marjaghal (also Romanized as Mardzhagal and Marjaqal; also known as Tulem Shahr) is a city and capital of Tulem District, in Sowme'eh Sara County, Gilan Province, Iran.  At the 2006 census, its population was 6,795, in 1,879 families.

References

Populated places in Sowme'eh Sara County

Cities in Gilan Province